The 1928 Michigan State Normal Normalites football team represented Michigan State Normal College (later renamed Eastern Michigan University) during the 1928 college football season.  In their seventh season under head coach Elton Rynearson, the Normalites compiled a record of 7–1 (3–0 against conference opponents), won the Michigan Collegiate Conference championship, and outscored their opponents by a combined total of 233 to 43. Raymond L. Stites was the team captain.  The team played its home games at Normal Field on the school's campus in Ypsilanti, Michigan.

Schedule

References

Michigan State Normal
Eastern Michigan Eagles football seasons
Michigan Collegiate Conference football champion seasons
Michigan State Normal Normalites football